Livia Klausová née Mištinová (born 10 November 1943) is a Slovak-born Czech economist who was the First Lady of the Czech Republic from 2003 to 2013 as wife of the President Václav Klaus. From 2013 to 2018 she served as the Czech Republic's ambassador to Slovakia.

An alumna of the University of Economics, Prague, she married fellow economist Václav Klaus in 1968. The couple have two sons, Václav (b. 1969) and Jan (b. 1974), and five grandchildren. Her father was Štefan Miština, who died in 1959.

Member of Supervisory Boards

References

Sources
Biography of Václav Klaus from Radio Praha

1943 births
Living people
Diplomats from Bratislava
Czechoslovak economists
First ladies of the Czech Republic
Czech women economists
Czech people of Slovak descent
Prague University of Economics and Business alumni
Václav Klaus
Ambassadors of the Czech Republic to Slovakia
Czech women diplomats
Czech women ambassadors